David Longdon (17 June 1965 – 20 November 2021) was a British multi-instrumentalist and singer, who was best known as the lead vocalist and co-songwriter of the progressive rock band Big Big Train. Besides singing, Longdon played flute, keyboards, acoustic and electric 6 & 12 string guitars, bass, mandolin, lute, banjo, accordion, percussion, dulcimer, psaltry, vibraphone, theremin and glockenspiel.

Early life and career
Longdon was born in Nottingham, England, on 17 June 1965.
He began writing music at age nine after discovering The Who.
He began his career as the lead singer of the band The Gift Horse.
Longdon was one of those who auditioned as lead singer of rock band Genesis in 1996, following the departure of Phil Collins. He auditioned during the making of Calling All Stations (1997), but the role was given to Scottish singer Ray Wilson.
He joined Big Big Train in 2009, and performed on numerous instruments in addition to his role as the lead singer beginning with the album The Underfall Yard in 2010.

Personal life
Longdon had a partner, Sarah Ewing. He had two daughters, Amelia and Eloise. He died on 20 November 2021, in a Nottingham hospital, following a traumatic fall at his home early in the previous morning. Steve Hackett described Longdon as "a lovely guy [with] a wonderful voice. He sounded fabulous singing on the vocal version of [Hackett’s song] 'Spectral Mornings'." Neal Morse and Geoff Downes also paid respects following his death.

Discography

With Big Big Train 
Albums
 The Underfall Yard (2009)
 English Electric Part One (2012)
 English Electric Part Two (2013)
 Folklore (2016)
 Grimspound (2017)
 The Second Brightest Star (2017)
 Grand Tour (2019)
 Common Ground (2021)
 Welcome to the Planet (2022)

EPs
 Far Skies Deep Time (2010)
 Make Some Noise (2013)
 Wassail (2015)

Solo albums
Wild River (2004)
Door One (2022)

With Louis Philippe 
 Jackie Girl (1996)
 Azure (1998)
 A Kiss in the Funhouse (1999)
 My Favourite Part of You (2003)
 The Wonder of it All (2004)
 Live (2007)

With Martin Orford 
 The Old Road (songs "Ray of Hope" "Endgame") (2008)

With The Tangent 
 Le Sacre du Travail (2013)
 L'Etagère du Travail (2013)

With Dave Kerzner 
 New World (song "New World") (2014)

With The Charlatans 
 Modern Nature (song "Walk with Me") (2015)

With Judy Dyble 
 Between a Breath and a Breath (2020)

With Downes Braide Association 
 Live in England (2019)
 Halcyon Hymns (2021)

Other projects
 Spectral Mornings (lyrics, flute and vocals) (2015) – along with Nick Beggs, Rob Reed, Nick D'Virgilio, Christina Booth and Steve Hackett.

References

External links
 
 

1965 births
2021 deaths
20th-century British male musicians
21st-century British male musicians
Accidental deaths in England
British multi-instrumentalists
British rock singers
People from Nottingham
The Tangent members